The 1971 IMSA GT Series season was the inaugural season of the IMSA GT Championship auto racing series.  It was for Grand Tourer-style racing cars which ran in the GTO and GTU classes, as well as former Trans Am Series cars in the TO and TU classes.  It began April 18, 1971, and ended November 21, 1971, after six rounds.

Schedule

Season results
Overall winner in bold.

Constructors' Championship
Points are awarded to the top six in each class in the order of 9-6-4-3-2-1.

GTO standings

GTU standings

TO standings

TU standings

External links
 World Sports Racing Prototypes - 1971 IMSA GT Championship results

IMSA GT Championship seasons
Imsa Gt Championship